John Daniel Gruden (born June 4, 1970) is an American former professional ice hockey defenseman. He currently serves as an assistant coach for the Boston Bruins. Prior to Boston, he most served as an assistant coach for the New York Islanders of the National Hockey League (NHL) from 2018-2022. He previously served as the head coach of the Hamilton Bulldogs and inaugural head coach of the Flint Firebirds of the Ontario Hockey League (OHL).

Playing career
Gruden played high school hockey in Hastings, Minnesota in the late 1980s. Drafted 168th overall in the 1990 NHL Entry Draft by the Boston Bruins, Gruden played for the Bruins, Ottawa Senators and Washington Capitals, playing a total of 92 regular season games, scoring one goal and eight assists for nine points and collecting 46 penalty minutes.  He also had a spell in the Deutsche Eishockey Liga in Germany for the Eisbären Berlin.

Coaching career
Gruden has worked as an assistant coach for the Detroit Little Caesars AAA hockey club, coaching for their Squirt 2000 squad. He coached for a short stint for the storied Brother Rice JV prep squad (1-16). He also spends time doing work on behalf of the Red Wings Alumni Association. Gruden coached the Stoney Creek High School Cougars hockey team in Rochester, Michigan along with fellow NHL alumnus Greg Johnson.

More recently, Gruden served as an assistant coach for the USA Hockey National Team Development Program, helping lead the United States to a gold medal at the 2014 IIHF World U18 Championships.

On March 26, 2015, it was announced that Gruden would serve as the inaugural head coach for the Flint Firebirds of the Ontario Hockey League during the 2015–16 season. In a highly publicized incident, he was fired a month into the season. Reports claim the firing was due to refusing to increase the playing time of defenseman Håkon Nilsen, the team owner's son, however team president Costa Papista denied the reports. Following a successful player walkout, Gruden was reinstated as the Firebirds head coach and given a three-year contract extension. On February 17, 2016, Gruden was again fired by the Firebirds. On June 3, 2016, Gruden was named head coach of the Hamilton Bulldogs. Following the 2017–18 regular season, he led the Bulldogs as the OHL playoff champions.

On July 18, 2018, the New York Islanders hired Gruden as an assistant coach. On June 9, 2022, Gruden was relieved from his duties.

On July 20, 2022, the Boston Bruins hired Gruden as an assistant coach.

Career statistics

Regular season and playoffs

International

Awards and honors

References

External links

1970 births
Living people
American ice hockey coaches
American men's ice hockey defensemen
American people of Slovenian descent
Boston Bruins draft picks
Boston Bruins players
Detroit Vipers players
Eisbären Berlin players
Ferris State Bulldogs men's ice hockey players
Flint Firebirds coaches
Grand Rapids Griffins players
Hamilton Bulldogs coaches
Ice hockey coaches from Minnesota
New York Islanders coaches
Ottawa Senators players
People from Virginia, Minnesota
Providence Bruins players
Washington Capitals players
AHCA Division I men's ice hockey All-Americans
Ice hockey players from Minnesota